Pipestela occidentalis is a species of sponge belonging to the family Axinellidae. 

The species was first described in 2008 from a specimen collected off the western shore of Barrow Island, Cape Poivre, Western Australia.

Description 
P. occidentalis is an orange, upright, tree-like sponge, 6.8cm in height and 7.9cm in width, with solid cylindrical branches.  It is very like P. candelabra but the distribution is disjunct.

References

Axinellidae
Sponge genera
Taxa described in 2008
Taxa named by John Hooper (marine biologist)
Taxa named by Rob van Soest